This is a list of 162 species in Baetis, a genus of small minnow mayflies in the family Baetidae.

Baetis species

 Baetis acceptus Müller-Liebenau & Hubbard, 1985 c g
 Baetis aculeatus Navás, 1915 c g
 Baetis acuminatus Gose, 1980 c g
 Baetis adonis Traver, 1935 i c g
 Baetis aeneus Navás, 1936 c g
 Baetis alius Day, 1954 i c g b
 Baetis alpinus (Pictet, 1843) c g
 Baetis alternata — Say, 1824
 Baetis atrebatinus
 Baetis andalusicus Navás, 1911 c g
 Baetis atlanticus Soldán & Godunko, 2006 c g
 Baetis baksan Soldán, 1977 c g
 Baetis baroukianus Thomas & Dia, 1984 c g
 Baetis berberus Thomas, 1986 c g
 Baetis beskidensis Sowa, 1972 c g
 Baetis bicaudatus Dodds, 1923 i c g b
 Baetis bifurcatus Kapur & Kripalani, 1961 c g
 Baetis braaschi Zimmermann, 1980 c g
 Baetis brunneicolor McDunnough, 1925 i c g b
 Baetis buceratus Eaton, 1870 c g
 Baetis bundyae Lehmkuhl, 1973 i c g
 Baetis canariensis Müller-Liebenau, 1971 c g
 Baetis catharus Thomas, 1986 c g
 Baetis celcus Imanishi, 1937 c g
 Baetis chandra Kapur & Kripalani, 1961 c g
 Baetis chelif Soldán, Godunko & Thomas, 2005 c g
 Baetis chinensis Ulmer, 1936 c g
 Baetis collinus Müller-Liebenau & Hubbard, 1985 c g
 Baetis conservatus Müller-Liebenau & Hubbard, 1985 c g
 Baetis consuetus (Hagen, 1858) c g
 Baetis cyrneus Thomas & Gazagnes, 1984 c g
 Baetis diablus Day, 1954 i c g
 Baetis diversicolor Tshernova, 1952 c g
 Baetis elazigi Berker, 1981 c g
 Baetis enigmaticus Gattolliat & Sartori, 2008 c g
 Baetis estrelensis Müller-Liebenau, 1974 c g
 Baetis feles Kluge, 1980 c g
 Baetis festivus Kapur & Kripalani, 1961 c g
 Baetis flavistriga McDunnough, 1921 i c g b
 Baetis fluitans Gillies, 1949 c g
 Baetis foemina McDunnough, 1936 i c g
 Baetis frequentus Müller-Liebenau & Hubbard, 1985 c g
 Baetis fuscatus (Linnaeus, 1761) c g
 Baetis gadeai Thomas, 1999 c g
 Baetis gemellus Eaton, 1885 c g
 Baetis hainanensis You & Gui, 1995 c g
 Baetis harrisoni Barnard, 1932 c g
 Baetis heptapotamicus Brodsky, 1930 c g
 Baetis himalayana Kapur & Kripalani, 1961 c g
 Baetis hudsonicus Ide, 1937 i c g
 Baetis hyugensis Gose, 1980 c g
 Baetis idei Müller-Liebenau, 1984 c g
 Baetis ilex Jacob & Zimmermann, 1978 c g
 Baetis illiesi Müller-Liebenau, 1984 c g
 Baetis ingridae Thomas & Soldán, 1987 c g
 Baetis intercalaris McDunnough, 1921 i c g b
 Baetis irenkae Soldán & Godunko, 2008 c g
 Baetis iriomotensis Gose, 1980 c g
 Baetis issyksuvensis Brodsky, 1930 c g
 Baetis jaervii Savolainen, 2009 c g
 Baetis javanica Ulmer, 1913 c g
 Baetis khakassicus Beketov & Godunko, 2005 c g
 Baetis kozufensis Ikonomov, 1962 c g
 Baetis lahaulensis Kaul & Dubey, 1970 c g
 Baetis lawrencei Crass, 1947 c g
 Baetis lepidus Müller-Liebenau, 1984 c g
 Baetis liebenauae KefferMüller, 1974 c g
 Baetis longinervis Navás, 1917 c g
 Baetis longistylus Kaul & Dubey, 1970 c g
 Baetis lutheri Müller-Liebenau, 1967 c g
 Baetis luzonensis Müller-Liebenau, 1982 c g
 Baetis macani Kimmins, 1957 c g
 Baetis macanis Ali, 1967 c g
 Baetis macrospinosus Koch, 1985 c g
 Baetis maderensis (Hagen, 1865) g
 Baetis magae (Barnard, 1932) c g
 Baetis magnus McCafferty and Waltz, 1986 i c g
 Baetis maurus Kimmins, 1938 c g
 Baetis meeheanis Ali, 1967 c g
 Baetis melanonyx (Pictet, 1843) c g
 Baetis meridionalis Ikonomov, 1954 c g
 Baetis milani Godunko, Prokopov & Soldán, 2004 c g
 Baetis mirkae Soldán & Godunko, 2008 c g
 Baetis mongolicus Tshernova, 1952 c g
 Baetis monikae Kopelke, 1980 c g
 Baetis monnerati Gattolliat & Sartori, 2012 c g
 Baetis muticus
 Baetis nexus Navás, 1918 c g
 Baetis nicolae Thomas & Gazagnes, 1983 c g
 Baetis niger
 Baetis nigrescens Navás, 1932 c g
 Baetis noshaqensis Uéno, 1966 c g
 Baetis notos Allen & Murvosh, 1987 i c g b
 Baetis novatus Müller-Liebenau, 1981 c g
 Baetis nubecularis Eaton, 1898 c g
 Baetis numidicus Soldán & Thomas, 1983 c g
 Baetis obscuriventris Tshernova, 1952 c g
 Baetis obtusiceps Tshernova, 1952 c g
 Baetis olivascens Ulmer, 1939 c g
 Baetis oreophilus Kluge, 1982 c g
 Baetis palisadi Mayo, 1952 i c g
 Baetis pasquetorum Righetti & Thomas, 2002 c g
 Baetis pavidus Grandi, 1951 c g
 Baetis pentaphlebodes Ujhelyi, 1966 c g
 Baetis permultus Kopelke, 1980 c g
 Baetis persecutor McDunnough, 1939 i g
 Baetis persecutus McDunnough, 1939 c g
 Baetis petrovi Tshernova, 1938 c g
 Baetis phoebus McDunnough, 1923 c g
 Baetis piscatoris Traver, 1935 i c g
 Baetis pluto McDunnough, 1925 i c g b
 Baetis posticatus (Say, 1823) i c g
 Baetis praemontanus Braasch, 1980 c g
 Baetis pseudogemellus Soldán, 1977 c g
 Baetis pseudorhodani Müller-Liebenau, 1971 c g
 Baetis punicus Thomas, Boumaiza & Soldán, 1983 c g
 Baetis punjabensis Kapur & Kripalani, 1961 c g
 Baetis realonae Müller-Liebenau, 1982 c g
 Baetis rhodani (Pictet, 1843) c g
 Baetis rusticans McDunnough, 1925 i c g
 Baetis rutilocylindratus Wang, Qin, Chen & Zhou, 2011 c g
 Baetis sabahensis Müller-Liebenau, 1984 c g
 Baetis sahoensis Gose, 1980 c g
 Baetis samochai Koch, 1981 c g
 Baetis scambus Eaton, 1870 c g
 Baetis septemmenes Dubey, 1971 c g
 Baetis seragrius Dubey, 1970 c g
 Baetis shinanonis Uéno, 1931 c g
 Baetis silvaticus Kluge, 1983 c g
 Baetis simplex Kapur & Kripalani, 1961 c g
 Baetis sinespinosus Soldán & Thomas, 1983 c g
 Baetis sogeriensis Harker, 1954 c g
 Baetis solangensis Dubey, 1970 c g
 Baetis solidus (Hagen, 1858) c g
 Baetis solitarius Gillies, 1949 c g
 Baetis spatulatus Gillies, 1994 c g
 Baetis spei Thomas & Dia, 1985 c g
 Baetis strugensis (Ikonomov, 1962) g
 Baetis subalpinus Bengtsson, 1917 c g
 Baetis sumatrana Ulmer, 1939 c g
 Baetis takamiensis Gose, 1980 c g
 Baetis taldybulaki Sroka, Godunko, Novikova & Kluge, 2012 c g
 Baetis thermicus Uéno, 1931 c g
 Baetis thurbonis Gillies, 1949 c g
 Baetis tigroides Gillies, 1949 c g
 Baetis totsukawensis Gose, 1980 c g
 Baetis tracheatus KefferMüller & Machel, 1967 c g
 Baetis transiliensis Brodsky, 1930 c g
 Baetis tricaudatus Dodds, 1923 i c g b
 Baetis tripunctatus Gillies, 1994 c g
 Baetis tsushimensis Gose, 1980 c g
 Baetis uenoi Gose, 1980 c g
 Baetis ursinus Kazlauskas, 1963 c g
 Baetis ussuricus Kluge, 1983 c g
 Baetis vadimi  g
 Baetis vaillanti Navás, 1931 c g
 Baetis vardarensis Ikonomov, 1962 c g
 Baetis venustulus — Eaton, 1885
 Baetis vernus Curtis, 1834 c g
 Baetis yamatoensis Gose, 1965 c g
 Baetis yixiani Gui & Lu, 1999 c g
 Baetis zdenkae Soldán & Godunko, 2009 c g

Data sources: i = ITIS, c = Catalogue of Life, g = GBIF, b = Bugguide.net

References

Baetis